Dolosbage is a village in the Kandy District, Central Province, Sri Lanka. The Raxawa and Kabaragala rocks are the main landmarks of this area. Dolosbage has many tea estates started during the colonial era. It has a cold climate due to its elevated position.

See also
List of towns in Central Province, Sri Lanka

External links

Populated places in Kandy District